Ch'alla Willk'i (Aymara ch'alla sand, willk'i gap, "sand gap", also spelled Challa Willkhi) is a  mountain in the Andes of Bolivia. It is located in the Oruro Department, Sajama Province, in the north of the Turco Municipality. Ch'alla Willk'i is situated northeast of Tankani and Mamaniri.

References 

Mountains of Oruro Department